Fiction II is Yuki Kajiura's second solo album, containing newly recorded versions of her previous anime and video games work as well as original songs.

Track listing

Performers
Yuki Kajiura: Keyboard and programming, vocals (on track 13), chorus (on track 3)
Emily Bindiger: Vocals (4, 6, 7, 9, 10, 12), chorus (4, 5, 6, 9, 12)
Yuriko Kaida: Vocals (11, 13), Chorus (2, 8, 9, 10, 14) 
Eri Itou: Vocals (8, 13)
Keiko Kubota: Vocals (13), chorus (2, 14)
Kaori Oda: Vocals (13), chorus (2, 14)
Margaret Dorn: Vocals (7)
Clara Kennedy: Vocals (5)
Deb Lyons: Vocals (2)
Johan Sara Jr.: Vocals (13)
Hanae Tomaru: Vocals (3)
Emily Curtis: Vocals (14)
Tokyo Konsie: Chorus (2, 7)
Wakana Ootaki: Chorus (9)

External links
  Victor's Website for Yuki Kajiura
 Detailed information about the album on Yuki Kajiura's fansite

Yuki Kajiura albums
2011 albums